"It's a Good Life" is a short story by American writer Jerome Bixby, written in 1953.  In 1970, the Science Fiction Writers of America selected it for The Science Fiction Hall of Fame, Volume One, as one of the 20 best short stories in science fiction published prior to the Nebula Award. The story was first published in Star Science Fiction Stories No.2. The story was adapted in 1961 into an episode of The Twilight Zone.

Plot summary
Anthony Fremont is a three-year-old boy with near-godlike powers: he can transform other people or objects into anything he wishes, think new things into being, teleport himself and others where he wishes, read the minds of people and animals and even revive the dead. His appearance is never completely described: the story mentions his "odd shadow" and "bright, wet, purple gaze", and the obstetrician at his birth was said to have "screamed and dropped him and tried to kill him". The town's children are told that Anthony is a "nice goblin", but they must never go near him.

Anthony's powers were present at birth, as he was able to kill the obstetrician and then, instinctively, separate his birthplace, the town of Peaksville, Ohio, from the rest of Earth moments after he was born. Nobody knows whether Anthony transported Peaksville somewhere or whether the rest of the world was destroyed and only the town remains.

There is no electricity, and the residents have to make their own things and grow their own food; the latter is somewhat difficult as Anthony changes the weather according to his whims. The adults must satisfy Anthony's every whim, or risk displeasing him. Nobody is safe from Anthony, not even his own family, although they can sometimes influence him slightly; after a "smiling" suggestion from his father, Anthony sends the remains of his victims into graves in the family cornfield, after he has finished with them.

As Anthony can read minds, the town's population must not only act content with the situation when near him, but also think they are happy at all times. However, the story does not present Anthony as malevolent or evil; he is simply a three-year-old boy with any young child's limited grasp of the world, yet with god-like powers. Even his sincere attempts to help those in need often go horribly awry, which is why everyone acts as if everything is "good" no matter what – any change Anthony makes could be much worse. Since Anthony can act immediately on any whim, those he dislikes can come to a quick and nasty end, even if he regrets it later, and no one dares suggest he undo what he has done, since the results could be worse still.

The story mostly takes place during a surprise birthday party for the Fremonts' neighbor, Dan Hollis. The residents take turns passing around certain objects, like books, music or furniture, since they cannot acquire anything new from the outside world. Dan receives a newly discovered Perry Como record for his birthday and wants to play it right away, but as Anthony does not like singing, the others advise him to wait until he gets home. Dan gets drunk and begins demanding that they sing, first "Happy Birthday" and then "You Are My Sunshine". Angrily he turns on Anthony's parents, crying, "You had to go and have him", then he defiantly continues to sing as Anthony appears in the room. Anthony decides Dan is a "bad man" and turns him into something horrific, "something like nothing anyone would have believed possible", before "thinking" him deep into the cornfield.

Because Anthony's Aunt Amy carelessly complained about the heat earlier, the next day Anthony makes it snow, which "killed off half the crops – but it was a good day".

Reception
Floyd C. Gale in 1961 called the story a "super-duper topnotcher". In 1986, it was included in the anthology Isaac Asimov Presents The Great SF Stories 15 as one of the best science fiction short stories of 1953.

In 2004, the story was a finalist for the 1954 Retro-Hugo Award for Best Short Story.

Adaptations
 "It's a Good Life" (The Twilight Zone), a 1961 episode of the 1959 TV series
 "It's a Good Life", the third segment; a remake of the Twilight Zone episode "It's a Good Life" in Twilight Zone: The Movie (1983). In this version, Anthony (no last name given) is depicted as eight (he is three in the original story and six in the original episode). He uses his powers to cater to himself and his "family", who are revealed to be random people that he has manipulated and held against their will. Anthony's real sister is crippled and has no mouth because she made Anthony mad. His real parents wanted to "send Anthony away" and are now simply gone. This depiction of Anthony is a much more sympathetic and tragic character who only wants people not to be afraid of him. He also is shown to love cartoons, making it the only thing everyone watches with televisions in every room in the house. According to Anthony "anything can happen in cartoons" and that he himself "can do anything. ANYthing!"
 "Bart's Nightmare – "Treehouse of Horror II" – The Simpsons (1991)
 "It's Still a Good Life", the 31st episode of The Twilight Zone (2002 TV series) which acts as a sequel to the episode in the 1959 TV series, with Bill Mumy and Cloris Leachman reprising roles from the original episode.
"Johnny Real Good", from the 12th episode of the first season of Johnny Bravo which stands more as a parody of the Twilight Zone episode. Johnny must babysit a boy with god-like powers who constantly sends him to a cornfield for thinking bad thoughts.

See also

The Science Fiction Hall of Fame, Volume One, 1929–1964, an anthology of the greatest science fiction short stories prior to 1965, as judged by the Science Fiction Writers of America

References

1953 short stories
American short stories
Fiction about telepathy
Horror short stories
Ohio in fiction
Science fiction short stories